Senator Reese may refer to:

David Addison Reese (1794–1871), Georgia State Senate
Glenn G. Reese (born 1942), South Carolina State Senate

See also
Senator Rees (disambiguation)